José Procópio Mendes, best known as Zezé Procópio (August 12, 1913 in Varginha, Minas Gerais State – February 8, 1980 in Valença, Rio de Janeiro State) was an association footballer in midfielder role.

In career (1932–1948) was played for Villa Nova, Atlético Mineiro, Botafogo, Palmeiras and São Paulo. He won a Brazilian Championship (1937), five Minas Gerais State Championship (1933, 1934, 1935, 1936, 1938) and two São Paulo State Championship (1942 and 1947). For Brazilian team he took part in 1938 FIFA World Cup, playing four matches without scoring goal.

He died at age 66.

References

1913 births
1980 deaths
Brazilian footballers
Brazil international footballers
Association football midfielders
Clube Atlético Mineiro players
Botafogo de Futebol e Regatas players
Sociedade Esportiva Palmeiras players
São Paulo FC players
1938 FIFA World Cup players